The 8th Congress of the Philippines (Filipino: Ikawalong Kongreso ng Pilipinas), composed of the Philippine Senate and House of Representatives, met from July 27, 1987, until June 17, 1992, during the presidency of Corazon Aquino. This was the first Congress after the ratification of the 1987 Constitution of the Philippines.

Legislation
Laws passed by the 8th Congress:

Leadership

Senate
President of the Senate:
Jovito R. Salonga (Liberal)
Neptali A. Gonzales (LDP) elected January 18, 1992

Senate President Pro-Tempore:
Teofisto T. Guingona Jr. (Liberal)
Sotero Laurel (UNIDO) elected July 23, 1990
Ernesto M. Maceda (PDP–Laban) elected January 18, 1992

Majority Floor Leader:
Orlando S. Mercado (Liberal)
Teofisto T. Guingona Jr. (Liberal) elected July 23, 1990
Alberto G. Romulo (LDP) elected July 22, 1991

Minority Floor Leader
Juan Ponce Enrile (Nacionalista)
Wigberto E. Tañada (Liberal) elected January 18, 1992

House of Representatives
Speaker of the House of Representatives
Ramon V. Mitra, Jr. (LDP, 2nd District Palawan)
Speaker Pro-Tempore
Antonio V. Cuenco (LDP, 2nd District Cebu City)
Majority Floor Leader
Francisco S. Sumulong (LDP, 1st District Rizal)
Minority Floor Leader
Rodolfo B. Albano (Nacionalista/KBL), 1st District Isabela
Mohammed Ali B. Dimaporo (KBL), 2nd District Lanao del Sur)  elected October 20, 1989
Salvador H. Escudero III (Nacionalista/KBL), 1st District Sorsogon)  elected June 1, 1990
Victor F. Ortega (Nacionalista/KBL), 1st District La Union)        elected July 22, 1991

Members

Composition

Senate

Notes

House of Representatives

District representatives 

Notes

See also
Congress of the Philippines
Senate of the Philippines
House of Representatives of the Philippines
1987 Philippine legislative election

External links

Further reading
Philippine House of Representatives Congressional Library

08
Fifth Philippine Republic